The Rooster Cup is a figure skating competition held annually in Courbevoie, France. It is an ISU figure skating competition for advanced novices and an inter-club competition for Basic Novice, Cubs, Chicks. First held in 2008, it is normally at the end of April.

Medalists

Advanced novice boys

Advanced novice girls

Basic novice A boys/Pre-novice boys

Basic novice A girls/Pre-novice girls

Cubs boys

Cubs girls

Chicks boys

Chicks girls

References 

International figure skating competitions hosted by France